The following is a list of the television networks and announcers who have broadcast college football's First Responder Bowl throughout the years.

Television

Radio

References

External links

First Responder
Broadcasters
First Responder